Ingénieur en Génie Informatique et Industriel (IG2I, EC-Lille) is an information engineering school in Lens, France.
Founded in 1992 by "Ecole Centrale de Lille", it offers courses in computer Science, networking, and industrial engineering.

References
IG2I web-site in French
IG2I page on Facebook

Grandes écoles
Educational institutions established in 1992
1992 establishments in France